The Bubblemen were a side project formed in 1988 by the members of alternative rock band Love and Rockets.  Love and Rockets members Daniel Ash (guitar, saxophone and vocals), David J (bass and vocals) and Kevin Haskins (drums, synthesizers) dressed up in bee-like costumes for performances.

History
The band released one single, "The Bubblemen Are Coming!", for which a music video was also produced. It was issued by Beggars Banquet Records in several format variations, including additional tracks "Bubblemen Rap", "Bubblemen Rap (Dub Version)" and "Bees". A brief excerpt of "The Bubblemen are Coming!" appeared in the Love and Rockets videos "No New Tale to Tell" and "Yin and Yang (The Flowerpot Man)".

Members
Daniel Ash – guitars, saxophone and vocals 
David J – bass and vocals
Kevin Haskins – drums, synthesizers

Discography

Singles
"The Bubblemen Are Coming!" (1988, Beggars Banquet Records)

References

Bauhaus (band)
English alternative rock groups
English new wave musical groups
British parodists
Parody musicians
Musical groups established in 1988
Musical groups disestablished in 1988